The 2022 Liga 3 West Sumatra is the fifth edition of Liga 3 West Sumatra organized by Asprov PSSI Sumbar.

Followed by 21 clubs. The winner of this competition will immediately advance to the national round.

PSKB is the defending champion after winning it in the 2021 season.

Teams

Venues 
 Ahmad Karim Stadium, West Pasaman Regency
 H. Ilyas Yacoub Painan Stadium, Pesisir Selatan Regency
 Singa Harau Stadium, Lima Puluh Kota Regency
 Persikatim Mini Stadium, Pariaman

First round

Group A

Group B

Group C

Group D

Second round 
Wait for the first round to finish.

References 

Liga 3 (Indonesia) seasons
Sport in West Sumatra